Anna Thammudu is a 1990 Indian Telugu-language action drama film, produced and directed by Krishna under his Padmalaya Studios banner. The film stars Krishna alongside his son Mahesh Babu and Gautami, with music composed by Raj–Koti.

Cast
Krishna as Raja Krishna Prasad
Mahesh Babu as Murali
Gautami as Rani Padmini 
J. V. Somayajulu as Vasudeva Prasad
Prabhakar Reddy as Yugandhar Rao
Giri Babu as Seshagiri
Vijayachander as Raja Mahendra Pratap
Sarathi as Gantaiah
Srihari as Goon
Jeeva as Jeeva
K. R. Vijaya as Rajeswari Devi 
Anjana as Sudha
Kuali as item number

Soundtrack

Music composed by Raj–Koti. Music released on HMV Audio Company.

References

1990s action drama films
Indian action drama films
Films scored by Raj–Koti
1990 drama films
1990 films
1990s Telugu-language films